Santiago Ojeda can refer to:

 Santiago Ojeda (footballer)
 Santiago Ojeda (judoka)